Marine is a village in Madison County, Illinois, United States. The population was 912 at the 2020 census.

History
The village was so named because some of the early settlers were sea captains.

Geography

Marine is located in eastern Madison County at  (38.787365, -89.778135). Illinois Route 143 (Division Street) passes through the center of the village, leading southeast  to Highland and west  to Edwardsville, the county seat. I-70 leads northeast  to Greenville and southwest  to downtown St. Louis.

The village drains southwest to an unnamed tributary of Silver Creek, a south-flowing tributary of the Kaskaskia River.

Demographics

As of the census of 2010, there were 960 people, 393 households, and 259 families residing in the village. The racial makeup of the village was 97.6% White, 0.6% African American, 0.4% Native American, 0.0% Asian, 0.7% from other races, and 0.6% from two or more races. Hispanic or Latino of any race were 1.3% of the population.

There were 393 households, out of which 26.7% had children under the age of 18 living with them, 53.2% were married couples living together, 7.1% had a female householder with no husband present, and 34.1% were non-families. 28.8% of all households were made up of individuals, and 23.2% had someone living alone who was 65 years of age or older. The average household size was 2.44 and the average family size was 3.03.

In the village, the population was spread out, with 20.2% under the age of 18, 8.3% from 20 to 24, 27.0% from 25 to 44, 29.6% from 45 to 64, and 12.7% who were 65 years of age or older. The median age was 38.3 years. For every 100 females, there were 97.9 males. For every 100 males age 18 and over, there were 99.5 females.

As of the 2000 census, the median income for a household in the village was $37,361, and the median income for a family was $44,500. Males had a median income of $38,654 versus $22,188 for females. The per capita income for the village was $18,133. About 4.5% of families and 6.2% of the population were below the poverty line, including 10.0% of those under age 18 and 2.8% of those age 65 or over.

Notable people

 Jerry Neudecker, umpire for Major League Baseball (1966–85); born in Marine
 Rusty Pence, pitcher for the Chicago White Sox; born in Marine
 Earl Emanuel Shepard, American Orthodontist
 Mark Voigt, racer with several NASCAR starts

Education 
Marine is part of the Triad Community Unit School District No. 2 which also includes the towns of Troy, IL and St. Jacob, IL.  Marine has one elementary school which is located within the city limits.  Students in grades preK-5 attend this school.  Then students will attend Triad Middle School followed by Triad High School along with students from Troy and St. Jacob.

References

External links 
 

Villages in Madison County, Illinois
Villages in Illinois